My Cousin Rachel  is a British mystery television series adapted from the novel of the same title by Daphne du Maurier. It first aired on BBC 2 in four parts between 7 and 28 March 1983.

Plot synopsis
Philip Ashley’s cousin and guardian Ambrose has mysteriously died in Italy. Philip distrusts the diagnosis of a brain tumor due to letters from Ambrose describing suspicions that Rachel and her attorney Rainalidi are trying to poison him. Ambrose had not made a new will upon his marriage to Rachel, leaving Philip the heir to the large estate. When Rachel arrives in Cornwall, Philip becomes enamored with her despite his misgivings. He makes preparations to transfer the estate to Rachel and, encouraged by her behavior, assumes they will be married. Rachel rejects this, claiming he has misunderstood, and Philip falls ill. Rachel nurses him back to health and when recovered, Philip suspects that she poisoned him. He searches her room looking for evidence. Finding none, he realizes he has misjudged Rachel and also realizes he has failed to warn her of a dangerous bridge in the garden. He finds her broken body under the collapsed bridge.

Cast
 Geraldine Chaplin as Contessa Rachel Sangalletti
 Christopher Guard as Philip Ashley
 Charles Kay as  Rainaldi
 Amanda Kirby as  Louise Kendall 
 Bert Parnaby as  Seecombe
 John Shrapnel as  Ambrose Ashley
 John Stratton as Nick Kendall
 Keith Marsh as  Rev. Pascoe
 Michael Mellinger as  Giuseppe
 John Bryans as  Mr. Couch
 Esmond Knight as  Sam Bates

Reception
In a 1985 review, John J. O'Connor of The New York Times commended the script and Chaplin's performance and the direction, noting it "captures the special Cornish atmosphere of the piece perfectly." O’Connor wrote "The problem with this psychological study is that dramatically it has no clearly defined resolution." He summarized the series as "a fairly absorbing treatment" but warned those looking for a "tidy" ending would be disappointed.

References

Bibliography
Baskin, Ellen. Serials on British Television, 1950-1994. Scolar Press, 1996.

External links
 

BBC television dramas
1983 British television series debuts
1983 British television series endings
1980s British drama television series
1980s British television miniseries
English-language television shows
Television shows based on British novels
Adaptations of works by Daphne du Maurier